Nicol Ó Leaáin, Bishop of Kilmacduagh 1394–1397. Ó Leaáin (O'Leane, Lane, Linnane) is associated with the Oranmore-Clarenbridge area of County Galway.

Ó Leaáin was appointed 14 October 1393 and consecrated c. 1394; confirmed bishop 30 August 1396. He died 1397. The see remained vacant until the appointment of Énri Ó Connmhaigh, Bishop of Clonfert, in March 1405.

See also

 Mauricius Ó Leaáin, Bishop of Kilmacduagh, 1254–1284.
 Nicol Ó Leaáin, Bishop of Kilmacduagh, 1358–1393.
 Noel Lane (born 1954), retired Galway Gaelic Athletic Association (GAA) manager.
 Sylvie Linnane (born 1956) retired GAA sportsman.

References

External links
 http://www.ucc.ie/celt/published/T100005C/
 http://www.irishtimes.com/ancestor/surname/index.cfm?fuseaction=Go.&UserID=
 The Surnames of Ireland, Edward MacLysaght, 1978.

People from County Galway
14th-century Roman Catholic bishops in Ireland